Laura Siegemund and Vera Zvonareva defeated Alicia Barnett and Olivia Nicholls in the final, 7–5, 6–1 to win the doubles tennis title at the 2022 WTA Lyon Open.

Viktória Kužmová and Arantxa Rus were the reigning champions, but Kužmová did not participate. Rus partnered Greet Minnen, but withdrew from the tournament before their first-round match.

Seeds

Draw

Draw

References
Main draw

2022 WTA Tour
2022 WTA Lyon Open - 2